İsmet Kür (born Zorluhankızı, 29 September 1916 – 21 January 2013) was a Turkish educator, journalist, columnist and writer of mainly children's literature. Her writings included children's stories, novels, memoirs, short story, poems, and non-fiction. As a journalist, she worked at the BBC World Service, Cumhuriyet, Barış, and Yeni İstanbul. She also provided programming at Ankara Radio, TRT, and Bayrak.

Personal life

İsmet Kür was born on 29 September 1916 in Göztepe, Kadıköy, in Constantinople, Ottoman Empire (now Istanbul, Turkey), in a mansion frequented by writers and poets. Her father Avnullah Kazim was a journalist, writer and politician, and her mother Ayşe Nazlı, an intellectual woman. Her sister Halide Nusret Zorlutuna (1901–1984) was a poet and writer. After the Surname Law went into effect in 1934, she took the family name "Zorluhankızı", meaning the "daughter of Zorluhan" because her name "İsmet" is mainly used for males, and caused confusion. Her father's ancestry of 6th to 7th generations was a Bey, a chieftain of Zorluhan in Erzurum Province, eastern Turkey.

After graduation from the Girls' Teacher School in Edirne, she studied in the Literature Department of Gazi Institute for Education in Ankara obtaining a teacher's degree in 1938.

She was married to a mathematician, who admired classical music and painting. By this marriage, she took the surname "Kür". She gave birth to two daughters, journalist and writer Pınar Kür (born 1943) and sculptor Işılar Kür. She has a grandson Emrah Kolukısa (born 1972), who is a program producer at the NTV television channel, the son of Pınar Kür and the father of her grand grandson Cem.

Kür went with her two young daughters to London to learn the English language on a scholarship. In 1953, she attended the Kent School of Drama. She lived also from 1956 to 1960 in New York City with her children. There, she attended in 1960 courses at New York University on children's and youth psychology, adult education, human relations, history of education and Russian literature of the 19th century.

During her time in the U.S., she founded the "Women's Association" with the spouse of the Turkish Ambassador.

She said in an interview that she owed her very old age to her practicing tennis, volleyball, skiing, and gymnastics, and exercising every morning. In September 2012, she contracted cerebral infarction, and became bedridden. She died at home on 21 January 2013 at the age of 96. She was interred at Ayazağa Cemetery following a religious funeral service held at Teşvikiye Mosque on 23 January.

Professional career

Educator and diplomat
Kür served as a school teacher of Turkish language and Literature for 21 years. In the 1950s, she worked at the BBC World Service in London. In 1956, she was appointed Deputy Student inspector for the United States territory, and was subsequently promoted to the post of Student Inspector in New York City. She also served as the Turkish Attaché of Culture there until 1960.

Journalist
She was a long-time journalist at Cumhuriyet. She worked as a columnist at the newspapers Barış and Yeni İstanbul.

Writer
Kür was a friend of many authors, particularly Kemal Tahir (1910–1973). She was the author of 27 books in the genres of research, essay, short story, poem, novel. and memoir. She also wrote sketches for radio and plays. She published her first poem in the periodical Çocuk Dünyası ("Child's World") in 1927, and her first short story Mutlu Tahayüller in the periodical Muhit in August 1931.

She wrote more than 100 sketches for the "Çocuk Saati" ( "Children's Hour") program at Ankara Radio. She also did children's programs for the radio stations TRT in Turkey and Bayrak in the Turkish Republic of Northern Cyprus.

She published her memoirs in Yarısı Roman (1995) and Yıllara mı Çarptı Hızımız (2008). Osmanlıca Çocuk Dergileri is a research work of hers on the children's magazines in Ottoman Turkish language, which made her well-known. She continued writing until her death.

Kür was a member of the "People of the Letters Association" and the "Turkish Union of Writers".

Works

Children's
 
 
 
 
 
 
 

Novels
 
 
 

Memoirs
 
 
 

Short story
 

Non-fiction
 Almanya'daki Çocuklarımızın Başarısızlık Nedenleri
 
 
 Anneler Sizin İçin (1964)

Poems
 
 Yaşamak'' (1945)

References

External links

 Her autobiography on the TRT archive video

1916 births
People from Kadıköy
Writers from Istanbul
Gazi Eğitim Enstitüsü alumni
Turkish schoolteachers
Turkish women civil servants
Turkish civil servants
Turkish expatriates in the United States
Turkish women diplomats
New York University alumni
Turkish women journalists
Turkish columnists
Cumhuriyet people
Turkish women children's writers
Turkish children's writers
Turkish dramatists and playwrights
Turkish autobiographers
Turkish non-fiction writers
2013 deaths
20th-century Turkish women writers
20th-century Turkish writers
21st-century Turkish women writers
Women autobiographers
Turkish women columnists